Good Company is an American television sitcom that aired on CBS on Monday nights from March 4, 1996, to April 22, 1996.

Synopsis
The series was set at the offices of Blanton, Booker & Hayden Agency, a Manhattan ad agency. Those seen were Zoe, the newly appointed creative director, Will, the art director, Jack, the senior copywriter, Jody, Jack's assistant, Ron, the account director, Liz, another copywriter, Dale, a junior art director, and Bobby the agency's president and CEO.

Cast
Wendie Malick as Zoe Hellstrom
Jason Beghe as Ron Nash
Jon Tenney as Will Hennessey
Seymour Cassel as Jack O'Shea
Timothy Fall as Jody
Lauren Graham as Liz Gibson
Elizabeth Anne Smith as Dale
Terry Kiser as Bobby McDermott

Episodes

References

External links 
 

1996 American television series debuts
1996 American television series endings
CBS original programming
Television series by CBS Studios
1990s American sitcoms
Television shows set in New York City
1990s American workplace comedy television series
Television series about advertising